The 1993 Australian Production Car Championship was a CAMS sanctioned motor racing competition open to Group 3E Production Cars. The championship, which was the seventh Australian Production Car Championship, was won by Mal Rose driving a Ford EB Falcon.

Calendar
The championship was contested over six rounds at three events.

Points system
Championship points were awarded on a 20–15–12–10–8–6–4–3–2–1 basis to the top ten finishers in each round.

Results

References

Australian Production Car Championship
Production Car Championship